The 2004–05 season was the 94th season in Hajduk Split’s history and their fourteenth in the Prva HNL. Their 1st place finish in the 2003–04 season meant it was their 14th successive season playing in the Prva HNL.

First-team squad 
Squad at end of season

Left club during season

Competitions

Overall record

Prva HNL

First stage

Second stage (championship play-off)

Results summary

Results by round

Results by opponent

Source: 2004–05 Croatian First Football League article

Matches

Croatian Football Super Cup

Source: HRnogomet.com

Prva HNL

First stage

Source: HRnogomet.com

Championship play-off

Source: HRnogomet.com

Croatian Football Cup

Source: HRnogomet.com

Champions League

Second qualifying round 

Source: uefa.com

Player seasonal records

Top scorers

Source: Competitive matches

See also
2004–05 Croatian First Football League
2004–05 Croatian Football Cup

References

External sources
 2004–05 Prva HNL at HRnogomet.com
 2004–05 Croatian Cup at HRnogomet.com
 2004–05 UEFA Champions League at rsssf.com

HNK Hajduk Split seasons
Hajduk Split
Croatian football championship-winning seasons